Natthapon Suttiroj (Thai ณัฐพล สุทธิโรจน์), is a Thai futsal Midfielder, and currently a member of  Thailand national futsal team.

He competed for Thailand at the 2008 FIFA Futsal World Cup finals in Brazil.

References

Natthapon Suttiroj
1983 births
Living people
Natthapon Suttiroj
Southeast Asian Games medalists in futsal
Competitors at the 2011 Southeast Asian Games